Kullanchavadi is a developed village cum small town along the NH 532 in the Kurinjipadi Taluk in Cuddalore district of Tamil Nadu, India. It covers part of Vazhudhalambattu, Ambalavananpettai, Appiyampettai and Agaram Panchayaths. It is located 20 km towards south from district headquarters Cuddalore.

Panruti, Parangipettai, Neyveli, Nellikuppam, Kurinjipadi, Vadalur and Cuddalore are the nearby towns to Kullanchavadi.

References

Villages in Cuddalore district